Marshall Lee Brant (born September 17, 1955) is a former  Major League Baseball player. In eight career games, he had two hits, two RBIs and a .100 AVG. He batted and threw right-handed.

He was drafted by the New York Mets in the 4th round of the 1975 amateur draft. For his success in the minors, Brant became a 2015 inductee of the International League Hall of Fame.

External links

1955 births
Living people
New York Yankees players
Oakland Athletics players
Major League Baseball first basemen
Baseball players from California
Sonoma State Seawolves baseball players
American expatriate baseball players in Japan
Nippon Ham Fighters players
International League MVP award winners
Santa Rosa Bear Cubs baseball players